Mazagran is a kind of drinkware usually used for coffee, which is named after the town of Mazagran in Algeria.

Overview
A battle took place there in 1840 between French soldiers and Algerians and the legend says that during the night, the 123 besieged French soldiers drank coffee laced with alcoholic beverages. It is a glass or cup on a foot, optionally also with a handle or a short stem. Mazagrans can be made of terracotta, porcelain or glass.

Coffee drinks (for example: coffee with ice) served in mazagran are sometimes also named mazagran. Mazagran was a name of a failed carbonated coffee soda beverage developed as a collaboration between Starbucks and Pepsi in the mid-1990s.

See also 
 Mazagran, a coffee drink made with lemon juice

References

Drinkware
Starbucks
PepsiCo brands